Skrela is a surname. Notable people with the surname include:

 David Skrela (born 1979), French rugby union footballer
 Gaëlle Skrela (born 1983), French basketball player
 Jean-Claude Skrela (born 1949), French rugby player and coach, father of David